Basic Rights Oregon is an American nonprofit LGBT rights organization based in Portland, Oregon. It is the largest advocacy, education, and political organization working in Oregon to end discrimination based on sexual orientation and gender identity. Basic Rights Oregon has a full-time staff, a contract lobbyist, and more than 10,000 contributors, and 5,000 volunteers. It is a 501(c)(4) organization that maintains a 501(c)(3) education fund, a state candidate PAC and a ballot measure PAC. The organization is a member of the Equality Federation.

Background
Oregon Citizens Alliance (OCA), an organization that opposed LGBT rights, successfully backed the passage of a 1988 ballot measure revoking the ban on sexual-orientation discrimination in the state's executive branch. In 1992, when OCA proposed a ballot measure to prohibit the "encouragement" of homosexual lifestyles in public schools, Oregonians who supported LGBT rights raised over $2 million and were successful in defeating the measure. OCA continued to promote similar measures at the local level and promised another statewide ballot in 1994. In response activists pressured for a stable political organization and formed Support Our Communities-PAC (SOC-PAC) in 1993. The following year, SOC-PAC successfully organized the opposition to another OCA proposal, a ballot measure to ban the recognition of homosexuals as a minority group. Oregon Ballot Measure 9, in the year 2000, would have prevented any positive or neutral language from being used by educators or administrators in all Oregon public schools from kindergarten through Ph.D. Prohibition of Public School Instruction on Homosexual Behaviors, Measure 9 (2000).

Advocacy
Basic Rights Oregon held its first meetings in 1995 and became a 501(c)(4) organization in 1996.

In 1999, Basic Rights launched the Fair Workplace Project, which was designed to increase the number of employers voluntarily adopting nondiscrimination policies.

In 2002, Basic Rights Oregon endorsed Democratic candidate Bill Bradbury for election to the United States Senate, opposing the Human Rights Campaign, a national LGBT rights organization, which endorsed the re-election of the Republican incumbent Gordon H. Smith.

In 2004, Basic Rights Oregon, nine same-sex couples, the American Civil Liberties Union, and Multnomah County joined as plaintiffs against the State of Oregon, the Governor, the Attorney General, the Director of the Department of Human Services, and the State Registrar in a suit, Li v. State, in the Oregon Supreme Court seeking a declaration that the statutes (ORS chapter 106) prohibiting same-sex couples from marrying on the same terms as different-sex couples violated the Oregon Constitution.

In 2004, Basic Rights Oregon worked against Ballot Measure 36, which amended the Oregon Constitution to prohibit same-sex marriage. Although Basic Rights Oregon raised nearly $3 million to fight the measure, it passed with 57% in favor and 43% opposed. Following this loss, Basic Rights Oregon hired its first team of field organizers and pushed nondiscrimination ordinances in Washington County, Bend, Hillsboro, and Wasco County.

In 2007, Basic Rights led the lobbying effort to pass the Oregon Equality Act and the Oregon Family Fairness Act.

In 2012, following years of education and collaboration with Basic Rights Oregon, the state Insurance Division issued a bulletin banning many private insurers from selling discriminatory policies in Oregon.

In 2015, in the wake of the Supreme Court ruling on Marriage Equality, Basic Rights Oregon adopted a new strategic direction for 2015-2020. The new strategic direction seeks to center the voices of LGBTQ people of color, of rural and religious LGBTQ Oregonians, and of transgender and gender non-conforming Oregonians.

In 2015, Oregon became the third state to ban the discredited practice of conversion therapy on minors. Basic Rights Oregon joined the effort begun by the Democratic Party of Oregon LGBT Caucus in 2013 to pass HB2307, the Youth Mental Health Protection Act, which was signed into law by Governor Kate Brown, the nation's only out bisexual governor.

In 2017 Oregon passed HB 2673A - effective January 1, 2018 - simplifying the process for changing the name on a birth certificate, and also establishing a gender amendment process for transgender citizens. The revisions provide less expensive, more private and simpler transactions. The Department of Motor Vehicles also changed its procedure for gender changes on IDs, allowing Oregonians to self-certify gender change without input from their health provider. Furthermore, effective July 1, 2017, the DMV made Oregon the first state in the country to recognize non-binary identities. The third marker on IDs is "X", for "not specified."

As of January 1, 2018, contractors working with the state of Oregon must have in place policies and practices which prohibit discrimination against their LGBTQ employees. The sponsor of the successful bill, HB 3060, was Rep. Ann Lininger. The measure also prevents state contractors from health care discrimination based on gender identity.

See also

 LGBT rights in Oregon
 Same-sex marriage in Oregon
 List of LGBT rights organizations

References

External links

 Basic Rights Oregon (official website)

1995 establishments in Oregon
501(c)(4) nonprofit organizations
Equality Federation
LGBT organizations in the United States
LGBT political advocacy groups in Oregon
Non-profit organizations based in Oregon
Organizations based in Portland, Oregon
Organizations established in 1995